Dena Janae King (born 1981) is an American lawyer and who has served as the United States attorney for the Western District of North Carolina since 2021.

Education

King received her her Bachelor of Science, magna cum laude, from the North Carolina State University in 2003 and her Juris Doctor from North Carolina Central University School of Law in 2006.

Career

From 2006 to 2008, King served as an Assistant District Attorney at the Mecklenburg County District Attorney's Office in Charlotte, North Carolina. From 2009 to 2014, she served as an enforcement attorney in the Securities Division at the North Carolina Department of State. From 2014 to 2020, she served as a Special Assistant United States Attorney and then as an Assistant United States Attorney in the United States Attorney's office for the Eastern District of North Carolina. From 2020 to 2021, she served as an Assistant United States Attorney in the United States Attorney’s office for the Western District of North Carolina while having the duties of deputy criminal chief for the violent crimes, organized crime drug enforcement task forces, and narcotics units.

United States attorney for the Western District of North Carolina 

On September 28, 2021, President Joe Biden nominated King to be the United States Attorney for the Western District of North Carolina. On October 28, 2021, her nomination was favorably reported out of committee by a voice vote. On November 19, 2021, her nomination confirmed in the United States Senate by voice vote. She was sworn in on November 29, 2021, by Chief Judge Martin Karl Reidinger. Upon confirmation, King became the first Black person or person of color to serve as U.S. Attorney in the Western District of North Carolina.

References

1981 births
Living people
21st-century American women lawyers
21st-century American lawyers
African-American lawyers
Assistant United States Attorneys
District attorneys in North Carolina
Lawyers from Charlotte, North Carolina
North Carolina State University alumni
North Carolina Central University alumni
United States Attorneys for the Western District of North Carolina